Vittorio Guerrieri (born 23 December 1958) is an Italian actor and voice actor, known for being the official dubber of Ben Stiller.

Biography
Born in Rome, Guerrieri made his acting debut at the age of nine on the television show Lazarillo, as well as making an appearance in the 1977 film A Special Day. As a voice actor, Guerrieri serves as the official Italian voice of Ben Stiller, as well as dubbing John Corbett, Steve Carell, Owen Wilson, Charles Martin Smith, Steve Zahn and Joseph Fiennes. He also dubbed Matthew Fox in Lost as well as Jason Bateman in Arrested Development.

In Guerrieri's animated roles, he voiced Squit in the Italian dub of Animaniacs as well as Freakazoid in the Italian dub of the series of the same name. He has also performed Italian voice dubbing roles in anime productions.

Personal life
Guerrieri is married to voice actress Roberta Greganti.

Filmography

Cinema
A Special Day (1977) - Umberto Taberi
The Legend of the Titanic (1999) - Don Juan (Italian version, voice)

Television
Lazarillo (1968) - Lazarillo

Dubbing roles

Animation
Tod in The Fox and the Hound
Squit in Animaniacs
Dexter Douglas/Freakazoid in Freakazoid!
Bernard in Megamind
Hank in A Scanner Darkly
Number 6 in 9
Pongo in 101 Dalmatians: The Series
Artie Ziff in The Simpsons
Dr. Benton Quest in Tom and Jerry: Spy Quest
Stu Hopps in Zootopia

Live action
Jerry Stahl in Permanent Midnight
Chas Tenenbaum in The Royal Tenenbaums
Derek Zoolander in Zoolander
Derek Zoolander in Zoolander 2
Greg Focker in Meet the Parents
Greg Focker in Meet the Fockers
Greg Focker in Little Fockers
Reuben Feffer in Along Came Polly
Guitar Center Guy in Tenacious D in The Pick of Destiny
David Starsky in Starsky & Hutch
Larry Daley in Night at the Museum
Larry Daley in Night at the Museum: Battle of the Smithsonian
Larry Daley in Night at the Museum: Secret of the Tomb
Josh Kovaks in Tower Heist
Alex Rose in Duplex
Eddie Cantrow in The Heartbreak Kid
Tugg Speedman in Tropic Thunder
Roger Greenberg in Greenberg
Walter Mitty in The Secret Life of Walter Mitty
Matthew Meyerowitz in The Meyerowitz Stories
Ian Miller in My Big Fat Greek Wedding
Ian Miller in My Big Fat Greek Wedding 2
Dan Parker in Raising Helen
Miles Taylor in Elvis Has Left the Building
John Grogan in Marley & Me
Frank Heffley in Diary of a Wimpy Kid
Frank Heffley in Diary of a Wimpy Kid: Rodrick Rules
Frank Heffley in Diary of a Wimpy Kid: Dog Days
Andy Stitzer in The 40-Year-Old Virgin
Burt Wonderstone in The Incredible Burt Wonderstone
Jack Shephard in Lost
Michael Bluth in Arrested Development
Wesley Wyndam-Pryce in Buffy the Vampire Slayer
Miika, the mouse in A Boy Called Christmas

References

External links

1958 births
Living people
Male actors from Rome
Italian male voice actors
Italian male child actors
Italian male television actors
Italian male film actors
Italian voice directors
20th-century Italian male actors
21st-century Italian male actors